Saint Mark's Roman Catholic Church (Greek: Ιερός Ναός Αγίου Μάρκου) is located on the St. Mark square in the city of Zakynthos and is the only Catholic church on the island with the same name.

History 
The church was built in 1518 and rebuilt twice, in 1747 and 1894. It was completely destroyed during the 1953 Ionian earthquake, like most buildings on Zakynthos. During the sixties, the church was built in its current form. A renovation took place in 1994. Before the earthquake there were valuable relics, statues, a large organ, artistic candlesticks and valuable priestly robes in the church.

Near the church was a building with a large library and extensive photo gallery. Among other things, a large part of the statues, the organ, the historical archive and the library were lost during the great fire that broke out after the earthquake. Residents who have seen the church with their own eyes before the earthquake still call it the jewel of the island.

Current church

The current church was built during the 1960s and has retained most of the external characteristics of the old church. Inside the church are the few remaining objects of the destroyed church like the statue of St. Mark, two of the large candlesticks that are to the left and right of the pedestal of the statue, the Holy Cross, the small marble baptismal font and other smaller objects. The small marble font stood at the entrance to the old church and was used for holy water rites. When one enters, there is a statue of Saint Paraskevi on the right. Together with the one of St. Mark, they are the only two statues that have been saved from the fire. The marble slabs of the old have been laid on the floor of the new church.

The current church was renovated in the first quarter of 1994. Among other things, the floor, the altar, the pedestal of the statue of St. Mark, the foot of the monstrance containing the Eucharist, the pulpit, the lighting and part of the furniture were renovated.

References

Roman Catholic churches completed in 1518
20th-century Roman Catholic church buildings in Greece
Roman Catholic churches completed in 1965
16th-century Roman Catholic churches in Greece